Salim Osman is a Bangladesh Jatiya Party politician and the member of parliament from Narayanganj, the constituency of his deceased elder brother. In his early life, he was selling poultry from home to home.

Career
In 2014, Osman was elected president of Bangladesh Knitwear Manufacturers and Exporters Association. In June 2014, he was elected to parliament from the Narayanganj-5, after the death of the former representative, Nasim Osman, his older brother.

On 13 May 2016, Osman publicly shamed the headmaster of a school at Narayanganj's Bandar Upazila for allegedly insulting Islam. The incident was recorded and published on YouTube. The headmaster, Shyamal Kanti Bhakta, filed a charge of assaulting against him. In October 2018, a Dhaka court discharged Osman from the case.

Personal life
Osman's father AKM Samsuzzoha was a member of parliament and his elder brother Shamim Osman is member of parliament from Bangladesh Awami League.

References

Living people
People from Narayanganj District
Place of birth missing (living people)
Year of birth missing (living people)
11th Jatiya Sangsad members
10th Jatiya Sangsad members